Lillian Zinkant is a camogie player, winner of the Gaelic Star-AIB Junior Camogie Player of the Year in 1983.

Career
The daughter of George Zinkant of the 1951 championship winning Sarsfields team, she played with South Presentation, Cork and won All Ireland minor medals with Cork before inspiring her county's victory in the 1983 All Ireland junior championship, scoring a goal and four points in the final, and the 1984 National League title. After her retirement she was a noted camogie coach.

References

External links
 Camogie.ie Official Camogie Association Website

Cork camogie players
Living people
Year of birth missing (living people)